Levien is a surname. Notable people with the surname include:

David Levien (born 1967), American screenwriter, novelist, director and producer
Hannah Levien, Australian actress and writer
Jason Levien (born 1971), American sports executive
Jonas Levien (1840–1906), Australian politician
Julia Levien (1911–2006), American dancer, dance teacher and choreographer
Meredith Kopit Levien (born 1971), American media executive
Norman Joseph Levien (1871–1967), New Zealand army officer
Raph Levien, American software programmer
Robert Levien (1849–1938), Australian politician
Roy Levien, American inventor
Sonya Levien (1888–1960), Russian-born American screenwriter